Samakhun (also Romanized as Samākhūn; also known as Samākhon and Sīmākhūn) is a village in Karizan Rural District, Nasrabad District, Torbat-e Jam County, Razavi Khorasan Province, Iran. At the 2006 census, its population was 1,016, in 221 families.

References 

Populated places in Torbat-e Jam County